The Season seven 2022 Hawthorn Football Club season is the club's 1st season in the AFL Women's, the 1st season playing home games at the Box Hill City Oval, the 1st season playing home games at Frankston Park, Bec Goddard was appointed as the 1st coach of Hawthorn, and Tilly Lucas-Rodd was appointed the 1st captain.

Club summary 
The AFL Women's season seven will be the 7th season of the AFL Women's competition since its inception in 2017; having entered the competition in 2022, it is the 1st season contested by the Hawthorn Football Club. KFC, and Nature Valley are the clubs two major partners.

Season summary 
12 August 2021 – Bec Goddard is appointed as the club's inaugural coach.

21 January 2022 – Mitch Cashion is appointed as the club's list manager.

5 May 2022 – Hawthorn announces they have signed Olivia Knowles as High performance manager, and Keegan Brooksby as strategy and opposition coach. 

5 May 2022 – Hawthorn announces that KFC has signed on as a partner for four seasons.

10 June 2022 – Nature Valley signs with Hawthorn as a partner.

10 June 2022 – Cherie O'Neill, Lou Wotton, David McKay, and Brady Grey are announced as assistant coaches.

8 August 2022 – Tilly Lucas-Rodd is announced as the clubs inaugural captain, Jess Duffin is appointed the vice–captain, while Louise Stephenson and Tamara Luke round out the leadership group.

14 August 2022 – Due to ticket demand, Hawthorns round 1 game against Essendon was moved to Marvel Stadium.

18 October 2022 – Vice-captain Jess Duffin announces her retirement at the end of the season.

Playing list changes

Trades

Free agency

Pre-list signing

AFLW club signings

Rookie signings

Draft

S7 (2022) player squad

Pre–season

Home & Away season

Ladder

Awards, records and milestones

Club records 
 Highest score: 7.2, 6.8 (44)
 Lowest score: 1.1 (7)
 Biggest win: 13 points
 Biggest lose: 54 points
 Highest score conceded: 9.9 (63)
 Lowest score conceded: 4.7 (31)
 Consecutive wins: 3
 Consecutive loses: 4
 Most games played: Charlotte Baskaran, Catherine Brown, Jess Duffin, Aileen Gilroy, Tilly Lucas-Rodd, Tamara Smith, Lucy Wales – 10
 Most goals: Jess Duffin – 7
 Most behinds: Aileen Gilroy – 5
 Most disposals: Tilly Lucas-Rodd – 176
 Most kicks: Tilly Lucas-Rodd – 118
 Most handballs: Tilly Lucas-Rodd – 58
 Most marks: Kaitlyn Ashmore, Jess Duffin, Akec Makur Chuot – 25
 Most hitouts: Lucy Wales – 168
 Most tackles: Tilly Lucas-Rodd – 84
 Most games coached: Bec Goddard – 10
 Most home and away games coached: Bec Goddard – 10
 Most games won as coach: Bec Goddard – 3
 Most home and away games won as coach: Bec Goddard – 3
 Most goals in a season: Jess Duffin – 7
 Most behinds in a season: Aileen Gilroy – 5
 Most disposals in a season: Tilly Lucas-Rodd – 176
 Most kicks in a season: Tilly Lucas-Rodd – 118
 Most handballs in a season: Tilly Lucas-Rodd – 58
 Most marks in a season: Kaitlyn Ashmore, Jess Duffin, Akec Makur Chuot – 25
 Most hitouts in a season: Lucy Wales – 168
 Most tackles in a season: Tilly Lucas-Rodd – 84
 Most goals in a game: Jess Duffin, Tahlia Fellows – 3
 Most behinds in a game: Kaitlyn Ashmore, Jess Duffin, Tahlia Fellows, Aileen Gilroy – 2
 Most disposals in a game: Tilly Lucas-Rodd – 26
 Most kicks in a game: Jasmine Fleming – 19
 Most handballs in a game: Tilly Lucas-Rodd – 11
 Most marks in a game: Kaitlyn Ashmore – 6
 Most hitouts in a game: Lucy Wales – 24
 Most tackles in a game: Tilly Lucas-Rodd, Tamara Smith – 13

Milestones
Round 1
 Kaitlyn Ashmore – 50th AFLW game, Hawthorn debut.
 Zoe Barbakos – AFLW debut, 1st AFLW goal.
 Charlotte Baskaran – AFLW debut.
 Catherine Brown – AFLW debut.
 Dominique Carbone – AFLW debut.
 Bridgit Deed – AFLW debut.
 Mackenzie Eardley – AFLW debut.
 Tahlia Fellows – AFLW debut.
 Jasmine Fleming – AFLW debut.
 Sophie Locke – AFLW debut, 1st AFLW goal.
 Eliza Shannon – AFLW debut.
 Lucy Wales – AFLW debut.
 Tamara Smith – AFLW debut.
 Tegan Cunningham – Hawthorn debut.
 Jess Duffin – Hawthorn debut.
 Aileen Gilroy – Hawthorn debut.
 Tilly Lucas-Rodd – Hawthorn debut.
 Tamara Luke – Hawthorn debut.
 Akec Makur Chuot – Hawthorn debut.
 Sarah Perkins – Hawthorn debut, 1st goal for Hawthorn.
 Louise Stephenson – Hawthorn debut.
 Bec Goddard – 1st game as Hawthorn coach.

Round 2
 Aileen Gilroy – 1st AFLW goal.
 Kate McCarthy – Hawthorn debut.

Round 3
 Charlotte Baskaran – 1st AFLW goal.
 Laura Elliott – AFLW debut.
 Bridie Hipwell – AFLW debut.
 Isabelle Porter – AFLW debut.
 Ainslie Kemp – Hawthorn debut.

Round 4
 Kaitlyn Ashmore – 1st goal for Hawthorn.
 Aine McDonagh – AFLW debut.

Round 5
 Tahlia Fellows – 1st AFLW goal.
 Emily Everist – AFLW debut.
 Bec Goddard – 1st win as Hawthorn coach.

Round 6
 Jess Duffin – 1st goal for Hawthorn.
 Tilly Lucas-Rodd – 1st goal for Hawthorn.
 Jenna Richardson – AFLW debut.
 Aine McDonagh – 1st AFLW goal.

Round 7
 Tilly Lucas-Rodd – 50th AFLW game.
 Bridie Hipwell – 1st AFLW goal.

Round 8
 Akec Makur Chuot – 1st goal for Hawthorn.

Round 9
 Janet Baird – Hawthorn debut.

References 

Hawthorn Football Club seasons
Hawthorn